P. darwini may refer to:

Palpibracus darwini
Pantinia darwini
Paraclius darwini
Paraliparis darwini
Parazoanthus darwini
Parochlus darwini
Pediobomyia darwini
Pelycops darwini
Periophthalmus darwini
Phestia darwini, an extinct species of clam
Phthiracarus darwini
Phyllodactylus darwini, the Darwin's leaf-toed gecko, a lizard species in the genus Phyllodactylus
Phyllotis darwini, the Darwin's leaf-eared mouse, a rodent species found in Argentina, Bolivia and Chile
 Pinnixa darwini, a pea crab species in the genus Pinnixa and the family Pinnotheridae
Platydecticus darwini
Platytomus darwini
Polynema darwini
Polystyliphora darwini
Psammolyce darwini
Pteronema darwini
Puijila darwini, an extinct pinniped species which lived during the Miocene epoch

See also
 P. darwinii (disambiguation)
 Darwini (disambiguation)